The  is an electric multiple unit (EMU) commuter train type operated by the private railway operator Keihan Electric Railway on the Keihan Ishiyama Sakamoto Line in Japan since 1992.

Interior
Passenger accommodation consists of a longitudinal bench seating.Most of the 7000 series seat moquettes are green or blue.

Formations
, the fleet consists of five two-car sets (701 to 709), formed as follows.  All cars are motored.

Each car has one lozenge-type pantograph.

History
The first trains entered service in 1992.

Future developments
Between June 2017 and March 2021, the entire fleet of 700 series trains is scheduled to be repainted in the standard corporate Keihan Electric Railway livery of "rest green" on the upper body and "atmos white" on the lower body separated by a "fresh green" stripe.

References

External links

  

Electric multiple units of Japan
700 series
Train-related introductions in 1992
1500 V DC multiple units of Japan